Weariness is a 2014 novella by the Norwegian writer Jon Fosse.

The story is set some hundred years ago. The protagonist is the elderly woman "Ales", who is the daughter of "Alida" from Fosse's earlier novellas Wakefulness and Olav's Dreams.

Awards
In 2015, Fosse was awarded the Nordic Council's Literature Prize for the trilogy Wakefulness, Olav's Dreams and Kveldsvævd.

References

External links
 American publicity page

2014 novels
21st-century Norwegian novels
Norwegian-language novels
Nordic Council's Literature Prize-winning works
Novels by Jon Fosse